Fazal Shahabuddin (4 February 1936 – 9 February 2014) was a Bangladeshi poet and journalist. He was awarded Bangla Academy Literary Award in 1973 and Ekushey Padak in 1988.

Early life and career
Shahabuddin was born in Dhaka in 1936. His poetry spanned four decades from the mid-60s until his death. He was the founding editor of Bichitra, a weekly magazine, and he also worked at Shachitra Shandhani and Dainik Bangla.

Shahabuddin died in February 2014.

References

1936 births
2014 deaths
People from Dhaka
Bangladeshi male poets
20th-century poets
20th-century male writers
Recipients of Bangla Academy Award
Recipients of the Ekushey Padak
Burials at Banani Graveyard